Georgian Braille is a braille alphabet used for writing the Georgian language. The assignments of the Georgian alphabet to braille patterns is largely consistent with unified international braille.

Alphabet

The basic braille range mostly conforms with international norms, with the exception of sounds which do not occur in Georgian, such as  *f (reassigned in Georgian to თ t’), and  *q, which is used for ჩ ch’ rather than ყ q.

Punctuation

჻ is an old word divider, no longer in use.

References

French-ordered braille alphabets
Georgian language
Georgian scripts